Hale is the self-titled debut album by OPM Filipino band Hale, released in April 2005 under EMI Philippines.

The carrier single Broken Sonnet, was also featured on the compilation album FULL VOLUME, The best of Pinoy Alternative. the award-winning and well-received The Day You Said Goodnight, Kahit Pa, Kung Wala Ka and Blue Sky, together with Tollgate which can be found in Hale (Special Edition).  The album was certified Double Platinum in November 2005. and was certified Triple Platinum (90,000 copies sold) in May 2006.

Track listing and durations

Special Edition
 Original album ends here. The repackaged album, Hale (Special Edition) contains an additional AVCD consisting of 4 music videos and 2 bonus tracks.

Personnel 
All songs written and performed by Hale
Executive Producer: Christopher Sy
Produced by Russell Eustaguio & Kiko Guevarra
Label Manager: Ethel Cachapero
Business Analyst: Adrian Del R. Alfonso
All instruments recorded by Angee Rozul at Tracks Recording Studio
Vocals recorded by Darwin Concepcion at Freq. Studio
Mixed and mastered by Ferdie Marquez at Freq. Studio
Sleeve Design Supervision: Willie A. Monzon
Sleeve Graphi Design, Art Direction and Photography by Eric David, Wreckless Eric Studios, San Francisco
Band Color Portrait: Wawi Navarroza
Hand Lettering: Jack Ruaro
Electronic File Production: Artworks Graphic Design Inc.
All songs co-published by EMI Philippines, Inc. and Nonoy Tan

References

2005 albums
Hale (band) albums